The 7th European Badminton Championships were held in Groningen (Netherlands), between 17  and 20 April 1980, and hosted by the European Badminton Union and the Nederlandse Badminton Bond.

Medalists

Results

Semi-finals

Finals

Medal account

References
Results at BE

European Badminton Championships
European Badminton Championships
B
Badminton tournaments in the Netherlands
International sports competitions hosted by the Netherlands
Sports competitions in Groningen (city)